Jumping from a dangerous location, such as from a high window, balcony, or roof, or from a cliff, dam, or bridge, is an often used suicide method in some countries. Many countries have noted suicide bridges such as the Nanjing Yangtze River Bridge and the Golden Gate Bridge. Other well known suicide sites for jumping from include the Eiffel Tower and Niagara Falls. Nonfatal attempts in these situations can have severe consequences including paralysis, organ damage, and broken bones.

Jumping is the most common method of suicide in Hong Kong, accounting for 52.1% of all reported suicide cases in 2006 and similar rates for the years before that. The Centre for Suicide Research and Prevention of the University of Hong Kong believes that it may be due to the abundance of easily accessible high-rise buildings in Hong Kong.

In the United States, jumping is among the least common methods of suicide (less than 2% of all reported suicides in 2005). However, in a 75-year period to 2012, there had been around 1,400 suicides at the Golden Gate Bridge. In New Zealand, secure fencing at the Grafton Bridge substantially reduced the rate of suicides.

Suicide method 
Survivors of falls from hazardous heights are often left with major injuries and permanent disabilities from the impact-related injuries. A frequent scenario is that the jumper will sit on an elevated highway or building-ledge as police attempt to talk them down. Observers sometimes encourage potential jumpers to jump, an effect known as "suicide baiting". Almost all falls from beyond about 10 stories are fatal, although people have survived much higher falls than this, even onto hard surfaces. For example, one suicidal jumper has survived a fall from the 39th story of a building, as has a non-suicidal person who accidentally fell from the 47th floor. Suicidal jumpers have sometimes injured or even killed people on the ground who they land on top of.

Jumping out of a window 

Autodefenestration (or self-defenestration) is the term used for the act of jumping, propelling oneself, or causing oneself to fall, out of a window. This phenomenon played a notable role in such events as the Triangle Shirtwaist fire of 1911, the 9/11 terror attacks on the World Trade Center, and other disasters. It is also a method of suicide. In the United States, self-defenestration is among the least common methods of dying by suicide (less than 2% of all reported suicides in the United States for 2005).

There is an urban legend in the U.S. that many Wall Street investors autodefenestrated during the 1929 stock market crash. After the stock market collapse of 2008 this was alluded to by protestors brandishing a sign on Wall Street which said: "Jump, you fuckers!"

Prevalence 
Jumping makes up only 3% of suicides in the US and Europe, which is a much smaller percentage than is generally perceived by the public. Jumping is surprisingly infrequent because tall buildings are often condo or office buildings not accessible to the general public, and because open-air areas of high buildings (i.e. rooftop restaurants or pools) are often surrounded by high walls that are built precisely to prevent suicides. Jumping makes up 20% of suicides in New York City due to the prevalence of publicly accessible skyscrapers.

In Hong Kong, jumping (from any location) is the most common method of dying by suicide, accounting for 52% of all reported suicide cases in 2006, and similar rates for the years prior to that. The Centre for Suicide Research and Prevention of the University of Hong Kong believes that it may be due to the abundance of easily accessible high-rise buildings in Hong Kong (implying that much of the jumping is out of windows or from roof tops).

Most frequently used locations

Terminology 
In the United States, jumper is a term used by the police and media organizations for a person who plans to fall or jump (or already has fallen or jumped) from a potentially deadly height, sometimes with the intention to die by suicide, at other times to escape conditions inside (e.g. a burning building). It includes all those who jump, regardless of motivation or consequences. That is, it includes people making sincere suicide attempts, those making parasuicidal gestures, people BASE jumping from a building illegally, and those attempting to escape conditions that they perceive as posing greater risk than would the fall from a jump, and it applies whether or not the fall is fatal.

The term was brought to prominence in the aftermath of the September 11 attacks, in which two hijacked airliners―American Airlines Flight 11 and United Airlines Flight 175―were deliberately crashed into the Twin Towers of the World Trade Center, trapping hundreds in the upper floors of both buildings and setting the impacted floors ablaze. As a direct consequence, more than 200 people plummeted to their deaths from the burning skyscrapers, primarily from the North Tower with only 3 spotted from the South. Most of these people―especially those in the North Tower―deliberately made the decision to kill themselves by jumping as a quicker alternative to burning alive or dying from smoke inhalation; however, a small percentage of these deaths were not jumpers but people who accidentally fell. Many of these victims were inadvertently captured on both television and amateur footage, even though television networks reporting on the tragedy attempted to avoid showing people falling to avoid further traumatizing viewers.

See also 

 The Bridge (2006), documentary film about jumpers on the Golden Gate Bridge
 The Falling Man, iconic photograph of one of the hundreds of casualties of the September 11 attack victims who fell or jumped from the burning World Trade Center
 Lover's Leap, nickname for many scenic heights with the risk of a fatal fall and the possibility of a deliberate jump
 Suicide barrier, access-control fence erected at certain high places to deter jumpers
 Suicide bridge, particular bridges favored by jumpers

References 

Suicides by jumping
Suicide methods